Karolien Florijn (born 6 April 1998) is a Dutch rower. She was a member of the Dutch coxless four, along with Ellen Hogerwerf, Ymkje Clevering and Veronique Meester, that won an Olympic silver medal in Tokyo 2020. The same crew was a three-time European Champion (in 2019, 2020 and 2021) and won a silver medal at the 2019 World Rowing Championships. Florijn returned to the single sculls in 2022, winning the overall World Rowing Cup trophy and winning the gold medal at the European Championships in Munich.

Rowing family
She is the daughter of Ronald Florijn, who won gold at the 1988 Summer Olympics in the double sculls and gold at the 1996 Summer Olympics in the eight and Antje Rehaag, another Olympic rower. One of her brothers, Finn, is also an Olympic rower, although had to withdraw before the repechage because he had contracted COVID-19.

References

External links

1998 births
Living people
Dutch female rowers
World Rowing Championships medalists for the Netherlands
Rowers at the 2020 Summer Olympics
Medalists at the 2020 Summer Olympics
Olympic medalists in rowing
Olympic silver medalists for the Netherlands
20th-century Dutch women
21st-century Dutch women